Los Beatles is a compilation album by The Beatles released originally in Argentina in 1965 (Odeon POPS Exitos Permanentes DMO 55506). It collects various songs from various singles and EPs. It was the first compilation LP released in Argentina.

Track listing

Side one
 "Ticket to Ride" - 3:11
 "From Me To You" - 1:56
 "Thank You Girl" - 2:03
 "She's A Woman" - 2:58
 "I Feel Fine" - 2:20
 "Long Tall Sally" - 2:00

Side two
 "She Loves You" - 2:21
 "I'll Get You" - 2:06
 "I Want To Hold Your Hand" - 2:24
 "This Boy" - 2:11
 "Slow Down" - 2:54
 "Matchbox" - 1:59

References
http://www.beatlesbible.com/discography/argentina/

The Beatles compilation albums
Odeon Records compilation albums